Sebastiano Ricci (1569 – 7 January 1638) was a Roman Catholic prelate who served as Bishop of Città della Pieve (1630–1638).

Biography
Sebastiano Ricci was born in Cingoli, Italy in 1569. On 7 January 1630, he was appointed during the papacy of Pope Urban VIII as Bishop of Città della Pieve. He served as Bishop of Città della Pieve until his death on 7 January 1638.

References

External links and additional sources
 (for Chronology of Bishops) 
 (for Chronology of Bishops)  

17th-century Italian Roman Catholic bishops
Bishops appointed by Pope Urban VIII
1569 births
1638 deaths